Antony Gervase Mbassa (born 3 February 1972) is a Tanzanian CHADEMA politician and Member of Parliament for Biharamulo West constituency since 2010.

References

1972 births
Living people
Chadema MPs
Tanzanian MPs 2010–2015
Place of birth missing (living people)